Komtar is a state constituency in Penang, Malaysia, that has been represented in the Penang State Legislative Assembly since 2004. It covers George Town's city centre, including the eponymous Komtar, which houses Penang's administrative centre.

The state constituency was first contested in 2004 and is mandated to return a single Assemblyman to the Penang State Legislative Assembly under the first-past-the-post voting system. , the State Assemblyman for Komtar is Teh Lai Heng from the Democratic Action Party (DAP), which is part of the state's ruling coalition, Pakatan Harapan (PH).

Definition

Polling districts 
According to the federal gazette issued on 30 March 2018, the Komtar constituency is divided into 14 polling districts.

This state seat encompasses the heart of George Town's city centre, including Komtar Tower, Penang's tallest skyscraper and the administrative centre for the entire State of Penang. The Office of the Chief Minister of Penang is housed within Komtar as well. In addition, the Komtar constituency covers a significant portion of George Town's UNESCO World Heritage Site, specifically the area between Transfer Road to the west and Beach Street to the east, and between Campbell Street to the north and Prangin Road to the south.

The major landmarks within the constituency include Chowrasta Market, Campbell Street Market and Acheen Street Mosque, all of which are within the city centre's UNESCO Site. The shopping district within the vicinity of Komtar, which includes 1st Avenue Mall, Prangin Mall and Penang Times Square, are also within the Komtar state seat.

The constituency is bounded to the north by Macalister Road, Jalan Zainal Abidin (formerly Yahudi Road), Burmah Road, Transfer Road, Campbell Street and a short section of Armenian Street, to the east by a section of Beach Street, Carnavon Street, Magazine Road and Brick Kiln Road, to the south by a short section of the Pinang River and Dato Keramat Road, and to the west by Jalan Perak.

Demographics

History

Election results 
The electoral results for the Komtar state constituency in 2008, 2013 and 2018 are as follows.

See also 
 Constituencies of Penang

References 

Penang state constituencies